Point Hyllie is a project currently under construction in Malmö, Sweden. The complex will feature four high-rises, with the tallest one being a 110 m residential skyscraper. The project will contain approximately 320 residential units, including offices and stores.

The design was revealed at a press conference held by Malmö Municipality in August 2006, as the result of an international competition, featuring amongst others, renowned Austrian architects Coop Himmelb(l)au. The winning proposal was a design by Danish architect Lone Wiggers of  C. F. Møller Architects. Originally called "Malmö Tower" and intended to be 216 metres tall, covering 53 storeys, the project was ultimately reduced in height to 110 m.

See also 
List of tallest buildings in Sweden
Scandinavian Tower
Citytunneln

References

Buildings and structures under construction in Sweden
Skyscrapers in Sweden
Buildings and structures in Malmö
Proposed skyscrapers